Jurgen 

Antonius Johannes Jurgens (1867–1945), Dutch-British entrepreneur
Antoon Jurgens (1805–1880), Dutch margarine and butter merchant and industrialist
Arvīds Jurgens (1905–1955), Latvian footballer, ice hockey, basketball and bandy player
Bruce Jurgens (born 1965), American film maker
Cam Jurgens (born 1999), American football player
Dan Jurgens (born 1959), American comic artist
Dick Jurgens (1910–1995), American musician
Lois Jurgens (born 1925), American criminal
William Jurgens (fl. late 20th century), American historian and religious leader

See also 
Jürgens, a list of people with the surname
Jürgen, a list of people with the given name, also Jurgen